Nicolò Arrighetti (17 March 1709 – 31 January 1767) was an Italian professor of natural philosophy. He was born in Florence, Italy in 1709.  On 21 October 1724 he became a member of the Society of Jesus; he taught natural philosophy in Spoleto, Prato and Siena. He died in 1767.

His surviving works include treatises on theories of light, heat and electricity and on the causes of the movement of mercury in barometers.

See also
 List of Roman Catholic scientist-clerics

References 
 

18th-century Italian scientists
1709 births
1767 deaths
Scientists from Florence
18th-century Italian Jesuits
Jesuit scientists
Clergy from Florence